The Hundred of Skurray is a hundred within the County of Eyre, South Australia.

The main town of the hundred is Blanchetown.

History
The traditional owners are the Ngarrindjeri people.

Since the 1850s, European settlement has spread from Blanchetown.

References

Skurray